Santa Rosa del Aguaray is a distrito in the San Pedro Department of Paraguay.

Populated places in the San Pedro Department, Paraguay